Elise Ringen (born 21 November 1989) is a Norwegian former biathlete. 

Her greatest achievements include a bronze medal in the relay at the 2012 World Championships, and a World Cup victory in the relay in Hochfilzen during the 2011–12 season.

Ringen retired after the 2015–16 season.

Biathlon results
All results are sourced from the International Biathlon Union.

Olympic Games

World Championships
1 medal (1 bronze)

*During Olympic seasons competitions are only held for those events not included in the Olympic program.

References

External links
 
 
 
 

1989 births
Living people
Norwegian female biathletes
Biathletes at the 2014 Winter Olympics
Olympic biathletes of Norway
Biathlon World Championships medalists
21st-century Norwegian women